N63 may refer to:

Roads 
 N63 road (Ireland)
 Dr. Santos Avenue, in Parañaque, Philippines 
 Nebraska Highway 63, in the United States

Other uses 
 Aeroflot Flight N-63, which crashed in 1971
 BMW N63, an automobile engine
 , a submarine of the Royal Navy
 London Buses route N63